GTP-binding protein Rit1 is a protein that in humans is encoded by the RIT1 gene.

Function 

RIT belongs to the RAS (HRAS; MIM 190020) subfamily of small GTPases (Hynds et al., 2003).[supplied by OMIM]

Clinical significance 

Mutations in RIT1 are associated to Noonan syndrome.

Interactions 

RIT1 has been shown to interact with KLHL12 and Merlin.

References

Further reading